The combination jersey (also known as the multi-coloured jersey or technicolour jersey) was the jersey in the Tour de France worn by the leader of the combination classification.

History 
In 1968 the combination classification was introduced in the Tour de France. From 1969 on, the leader was recognized by a white jersey. The jersey was awarded to the cyclists that did best in all other classifications: General, Points and Mountains. It was seen as the classification for the all-round cyclist.
Only cyclists ranking in each of the three other classifications were ranked in the Combination classification. Ranking was established by adding the cyclists' ranks in the three other classifications: 1 point for rank 1, 2 points for rank 2 and so on. Cyclists being at level on ranks for one of the other classifications were added the average of the corresponding points (e.g. 2 cyclists being level at rank 3 where counting (3+4)/2 = 3.5 points). Finally, the lower the sum the better the combination classification ranking.

From 1975 on, the combination classification temporarily disappeared, and the white jersey was given to the leader of the young rider classification.

In 1980, the combination classification was reintroduced, sponsored by French television station TF1, therefore officially named "Grand Prix TF1". This lasted until 1984, when the combination classification disappeared again. In 1985, the combination classification was again reintroduced, and this time the multicoloured jersey was used. After the 1989 Tour, the combination classification was discontinued, as the new director Jean-Marie Leblanc wanted to modernise the Tour. Since then, the Tour has awarded only the yellow, white, green and polka dot jerseys.

Combination classification results

References

External links

Tour de France
Tour de France classifications and awards
1968 introductions
1989 disestablishments